Kauboji is a comedy musical authored by Saša Anočić, with music by Rakan Rushaidat and Matija Antolić.

Synopsis
The story follows eight people (described typically as losers) in an undefined setting who meet together in order to create a cowboy show, starting from an audition until the premiere. During this course of events, they develop their life stories, influencing each other and eventually becoming immersed in the development and begin viewing the show as a chance of a lifetime.

History
The show premiered on March 6, 2008 at Exit Theatre, which was preceded by six months of preparations.

On 11 January 2020, it performed its 500th show.

Crew
Author and director: Saša Anočić
Roles:	Živko Anočić/Damir Klemenić, Matija Antolić, Hrvoje Barišić, Krunoslav Klabučar, Rakan Rushaidat, Radovan Ruždjak, Ivana Starčević
Dramaturgy: Saša Anočić, Hana Veček
Scenography: Margareta Lekić
Costumes: Hana Letica
Music: Rakan Rushaidat, Matija Antolić
Lighting: Olivije Marečić

Reception
The show achieved a cult status as one of the most beloved theatre shows on the Zagreb scene and is regarded as the most popular and acclaimed show of Exit Theatre. It was continuously sold-out for 10 years. 

Boris Horvat, in a column for Vijenac, stated that the young acting ensemble managed to "adapt very well to the destitute theatric ambiance", and described the show as an impressive effort showing great enthusiasm.

Awards
Nagrada hrvatskog glumišta, 2008 (best show, best directing)
Plaketa grada Zagreba (best show, best directing)
Vjesnikova nagrada Dubravko Dujšin za kazališnu umjetnost, 2008 (best show)
Marulićevi dani, 2009 (best show, best acting, best directing, best actor)
Festival glumca, 2009 (best male actor, best young actor)
Dani satire, 2008 (honorary award, best actor)
Gavelline večeri, 2008 (honorary award)
25. Međunarodni kazališni susreti u Brčkom (best show, best male act)
Teatar Fest, 2009, Banja Luka (best show)
Outward, 2008 (best poster)
Makarsko kulturno ljeto, 2016 (best show, best male act)
16. Međunarodni festival glumca u Nikšiću, 2019 (Grand Prix best show)

Film adaptation

Due to its popularity, the show was eventually adapted into a movie during 2013, directed by Tomislav Mršić. However, the director entered a dispute with Saša Anočić over copyright, and the movie omitted the original show's credits.

External links
Official page

References

Croatian music history
2008 musicals
Theatre in Croatia
Croatian musicals